Laura Martínez Ruiz (born August 1, 1984) is a Spanish female artistic gymnast who competed at the 1999 World Artistic Gymnastics Championships and the 2000 Summer Olympics.

References

1984 births
Living people
Spanish female artistic gymnasts
Place of birth missing (living people)
Gymnasts at the 2000 Summer Olympics
Olympic gymnasts of Spain